Prospect Township may refer to:

 Prospect Township, Butler County, Kansas
 Prospect Township, Ramsey County, North Dakota, in Ramsey County, North Dakota
 Prospect Township, Marion County, Ohio
 Prospect Township, Mellette County, South Dakota, in Mellette County, South Dakota

Township name disambiguation pages